Camino Agrícola is an elevated metro station on the Line 5 of the Santiago Metro, in Santiago, Chile. It is similar in design as the adjacent stations. The station was opened on 5 April 1997 as part of the inaugural section of the line, from Baquedano to Bellavista de La Florida.

References

Santiago Metro stations
Railway stations opened in 1997
Santiago Metro Line 5